Cameron Alborzian (born 26 February 1967), also known as Yogi Cameron, is an Iranian-born British retired supermodel and Ayurveda therapist. He had a successful career in the fashion industry around the world, both in publicity and runway events, working for brands such as Guess, Levi's, Versace, Christian Dior, Valentino, Chanel, Gucci, Jean Paul Gaultier, Dolce & Gabbana, Karl Lagerfeld, Montana, John Galliano​ or Yves Saint Laurent. He also appeared in the music videos "Express Yourself" by Madonna, and "Something About the Way You Look Tonight" by Elton John (the latter with the British model Kate Moss). At the end of the 1990s, he abandoned modeling to work in closeness with people as an Ayurveda therapist.

Early life
Alborzian was born in Tehran, Iran to an English mother and Iranian father.

He attended various boarding schools in England and Wales as well as one year of college before dropping out and moving to London. Soon after his arrival, a modelling scout on the street spotted him. Several weeks later, he appeared in a Jean Paul Gaultier show in Paris to start off his career.

Career

Modelling
Alborzian started his career as a fashion model on the runways of Paris in 1986. Along with Gaultier, he worked for other designers such as Dior and YSL. He did not achieve wider fame for his work until he landed a contract with Guess jeans in 1988.

This work earned him a great deal of attention, including that of Madonna, Alborzian played his love interest in the music video for his song Express Yourself. He appeared in the 1997 music video for Elton John's "Something About the Way You Look Tonight", also starring Kate Moss. In 1998, he ended his career in fashion after he joined fellow models Naomi Campbell, Christy Turlington, and Kate Moss in visiting Nelson Mandela in South Africa for a charity event to benefit the Mandela Fund.

Ayurveda and yoga therapist
After the death of his close friend and mentor in naturopathy, Alborzian attended the Integral Yoga and Yogaville teacher training in New York. as well as a reflexology masters course at the Open Center in New York City. He continued his studies at Arsha Yoga Vidya Peetam Trust in Coimbatore, Tamil Nadu, India in 2003. At Arsha, he studies Ayurveda and yoga under Sri V. Vasudevan, who studied in the lineage of Brahmasri Poomulli Neelakantan Namboothiripad, Brahmasri Cherukalakapurath Krishnan Namboothiri, and Yogi Narayanji Maharaj.

Yogi Cameron is the author of four books: Ahora es el Momento, The Guru in You, The One Plan, and The Yogi Code.

References

External links 
 

1967 births
Living people
Biography articles of living people
British exercise and fitness writers
English people of Iranian descent
English health and wellness writers
Iranian emigrants to the United Kingdom
Iranian male models
English male models
British yogis
Ayurvedacharyas
Iranian people of English descent
People from Tehran
Yoga therapists